is a manga series written and illustrated by Jiro Taniguchi. Based on a 1998 novel by Baku Yumemakura, it follows Fukamachi, a photographer who finds a camera supposedly belonging to George Mallory, a mountaineer who went missing on Mount Everest, and goes on a mountain-climbing adventure along with his friend Habu Joji.

Release
The manga was originally serialized in the magazine Business Jump by Shueisha between May 2000 and July 2003 issues. It was collected into five tankōbon published between December 15, 2000, and March 20, 2003, then re-released in bunkoban between October 18, 2006, and January 18, 2007. An English-language version was licensed by British company Fanfare/Ponent Mon in 2007. On July 23, 2009, its first volume was released, and the last was released on July 31, 2015. It has also been published in French by Kana in 2004–2005, German by Schreiber & Leser, and Spanish by Ponent Mon.

Reception
In 2001, it was awarded a prize for excellence by the Agency for Cultural Affairs at the Japan Media Arts Festival, which praised its "powerful illustrations [that] seem to transport the reader right up into the mountains." Its English adaptation received a nomination for Ignatz Award for Outstanding Graphic Novel and Outstanding Series in 2010. The fourth English volume also was nominated at the 2014 Eisner Award in the category "Best U.S. Edition of International Material—Asia".

Adaptations

Live-action film
The manga was adapted into a live-action film, directed by Hideyuki Hirayama and starring Junichi Okada, Hiroshi Abe and Machiko Ono. Distributed by Asmik Ace Entertainment and Toho, it was released on March 12, 2016, and grossed .

Animated film

In January 2015, an international co-production was announced between French Julianne Films, Belgian Walking The Dog and Luxembourg Mélusine Productions to create an animated film based on The Summit of the Gods. Éric Valli and Jean-Christophe Roger were set direct the film, with Didier Brunner as producer. In June 2020, it was announced the film would instead be directed by Patrick Imbert, with scripts by Imbert, Magali Pouzol, and Jean-Charles Ostorero, and music composed by Amine Bouhafa. In August 2021, Netflix announced that it will be distributing the film to select movie theaters in the United States on November 24, 2021. It will then be followed by its streaming service debut on November 30.

See also
List of media related to Mount Everest

References

Further reading

External links

Historical anime and manga
Jiro Taniguchi
Live-action films based on manga
Mountaineering books
Mountaineering in anime and manga
Seinen manga
Shueisha franchises
Shueisha manga
Japanese historical drama films